The 2001–02 Asian Club Championship was the 21st and last edition of the annual international club football competition held in the AFC region (Asia). It determined that year's club champion of association football in Asia.

Suwon Samsung Bluewings won their 2nd consecutive Asian Championship, beating Anyang LG Cheetahs in an all-Korean final 4–2 on penalties at Azadi stadium, Tehran.

First round

West Asia

|}
1 Al-Hikma withdrew. 
2 Al-Ahli withdrew.

East Asia

|}
1 Sông Lam Nghệ An withdrew. 
2 Selangor FA were entered after Penang withdrew due to the club's financial problems. 
3 The match was played over one leg in Kashima on 24 October due to the political climate in Indonesia.

Round of 16

West Region

|}

East Region

|}

1 Saunders SC withdrew after the 1st leg.

Quarter-finals

West Asia

East Asia

Semi-finals

Third place match

Final
Referee: Ali Bujsaim (UAE)

References
Asian Club Competitions 2002 at RSSSF.com

1
1
2001–02